El Protector (2012) was the first annual El Protector professional wrestling event produced by the International Wrestling Revolution Group. It took place on January 12, 2012, at Arena Naucalpan in Naucalpan, State of Mexico. The 2012 El Protector was the first event produced under that name, but was a continuation of the Proyeccion a Nuevas Promesas ("Projecting a new promise") tournament of 2010 and 2011 . The focal point of the show was the El Protector tag team tournament where eight teams competed for the trophy.

Production

Background
Lucha Libre has a tradition for a tournament where a rookie, or novato, would be teamed up with an experienced veteran wrestler for a tag team tournament in the hopes of giving the Novato a chance to show case their talent and move up the ranks. Consejo Mundial de Lucha Libre has held a Torneo Gran Alternativa ("Great Alternative Tournament") almost every year since 1994, but the concept predates the creation of the Gran Alternativa. The Mexican professional wrestling company International Wrestling Revolution Group (IWRG; at times referred to as Grupo Internacional Revolución in Mexico) started their own annual rookie/veteran tournament in 2010. The first two tournaments were called Torneo Relampago de Proyeccion a Nuevas Promesas de la Lucha Libre (Spanish for "Projecting a new promise lightning tournament") but would be renamed the El Protector tournament in 2012. The El Protector shows, as well as the majority of the IWRG shows in general, are held in "Arena Naucalpan", owned by the promoters of IWRG and their main arena. The 2012 El Protector show was the third time that IWRG promoted a show around the rookie/veteran tournament, with the name changing to El Protector from this year and onwards.

Storylines
The event featured nine professional wrestling matches with different wrestlers involved in pre-existing scripted feuds, plots and storylines. Wrestlers were portrayed as either heels (referred to as rudos in Mexico, those that portray the "bad guys") or faces (técnicos in Mexico, the "good guy" characters) as they followed a series of tension-building events, which culminated in a wrestling match or series of matches.

Tournament participants
Angélico  and Dinamic Black 
Carta Brava, Jr.  and Máscara Año 2000, Jr. 
Centvrión  and Negro Navarro 
Eterno  and Apolo Estrada, Jr. 
Alan Extreme  and Black Terry 
  and X-Fly 
Saruman  and Veneno 
Tritón  and Tony Rivera

Results

References

External links 
IWRG official website

2012 in professional wrestling
2012 in Mexico
2012
January 2012 events in Mexico